Hollick-Kenyon Plateau is a large, relatively featureless snow plateau in Antarctica,  above sea level, located between the northern portion of the Ellsworth Mountains, to the east, and Mount Takahe and the Crary Mountains, to the west. It was discovered by Lincoln Ellsworth on his trans-Antarctic airplane flight during November–December 1935, and named by Ellsworth for his pilot, Herbert Hollick-Kenyon.

References

Plateaus of Antarctica
Landforms of Marie Byrd Land
Ellsworth Mountains